Space Rage is a 1985 American space Western film directed by Conrad E. Palmisano.

Premise 
Two centuries in the future, a dangerous lunatic named Grange (Paré) is sentenced to a penal colony, Botany Bay, on the planet Proxima Centauri 3. There, a bounty hunter (Laughlin) and an ex-policeman (Farnsworth) team up to prevent him from escaping.

Cast 
Richard Farnsworth as Colonel
Michael Paré as Grange
John Laughlin as Walker
Lee Purcell as Maggie
Lewis Van Bergen as Drago
William Windom as Gov. Tovah
Frank Doubleday as Brain Surgeon
Dennis Redfield as Quinn
Harold Sylvester as Max Bryson
Wolfe Perry as Billy Boy
Ricky Supiran as Kirk
Nick Palmisano as Carny
Rick Weber as Nose
Eddie Pansullo as Mean guard
Paul Linke as Duffy
Gene Hartline as Bubba
Allan Graf as Tiny
Paul Keith as Dr. Wehiberg
R.J. Ganzert as Tallahassee
Jim Bentley as Bob Smith
Susan Madigan as Mary Smith
William Cowley as Charlie
John Foscone as Waiter at party

Soundtrack 
The soundtrack includes The Spikes, The Screaming Believers, Exploding White Mice, Dream Syndicate, and Blood money.

Release 
The film is also known as A Dollar a Day, Breakout on Prison Planet, Trackers 2180, Trackers, and The Last Frontier.

Reception 
Leonard Maltin wrote that Farnsworth "should've turned [his laser-beam six-shooter] on the negative of this bomb."  TV Guide rated it two out of four stars and called it "an uneasy blend of science fiction and western", though it praised the unconventional casting of Paré as a villain.

References

External links 

1985 films
1980s Western (genre) science fiction films
American Western (genre) science fiction films
Space Western films
1980s English-language films
1980s American films